Blue Ruin is a 2013 American thriller film written and directed by Jeremy Saulnier and starring Macon Blair. Saulnier funded production on the film through a successful Kickstarter campaign, which MTV called "the perfect example of what crowdfunding can accomplish."

Blue Ruin premiered at the Cannes Film Festival as part of the Directors' Fortnight section on May 17, 2013, and won the FIPRESCI Prize. The film was nominated for the John Cassavetes Award at the 2015 Independent Spirit Awards.

Plot

Dwight Evans, a vagrant, lives out of his car in Delaware and scavenges for food and money. After learning of the impending release of Wade Cleland, the man who murdered Dwight's parents twenty years ago, Dwight returns to his hometown in Virginia. En route he steals a gun but breaks it trying to open its trigger lock.

Dwight watches the Clelands collect Wade from prison in a limousine and follows them. They go to a local club to celebrate Wade's release. Dwight follows Wade to the club's restroom and fatally stabs him. Having dropped his car keys in the club, Dwight steals the Clelands' limousine. Discovering a teenage boy, William Cleland, in the back of the car, Dwight lets him go. William implies that Wade didn't kill Dwight's parents.

After cleaning himself up, Dwight visits his sister, Sam, for the first time in years and tells her that he has killed Wade. Sam is shocked but relieved of this revelation. As the killing has gone unreported on the news, Dwight surmises that the Clelands have decided to seek revenge without police involvement. Since Dwight's car is registered to Sam's address, she flees her home with her daughters and Dwight waits in the family house for the Clelands' attack. Wade's two brothers, Teddy and Carl, arrive in Dwight's car. As Dwight escapes, he runs over Teddy and places the unconscious body in the trunk. Before he can drive away, Carl shoots him with a crossbow.

After having the wound treated at a hospital, Dwight returns to Sam's house to clean up from the attack. He tracks down Ben Gaffney, an old high school friend, and asks for help. After obtaining a rifle, Dwight interrogates Teddy at gunpoint on Ben's property. Teddy reveals that Wade was not his parents' killer. Dwight's father and Wade Sr.'s wife were having an affair. As revenge, Wade's now deceased father killed his father and his mother's death was incidental, as she just happened to be in the car during the ambush. Wade Jr. took the blame as his father was dying from cancer and the family did not want him to die in prison. Teddy wrestles the gun from Dwight, but is shot dead by Ben from a concealed position. Ben and Dwight put Teddy's body back into the trunk and part ways after Ben resupplies Dwight with food and more weapons. To keep Ben from further involvement, Dwight sabotages his truck.

Dwight goes to the Cleland house and removes as many hidden firearms as he can. He buries Teddy, and waits to ambush the Clelands. He leaves a message on the house answering machine telling them that Teddy is dead and asks them to leave Sam out of the dispute, saying that they are even. Carl, his older sister, Kris, and their cousin, Hope, return and listen to Dwight's message. When it becomes clear that the Clelands intend to kill Sam, Dwight shoots and kills Carl. He then holds the women at gunpoint while explaining his dilemma about whether he should kill them all. William enters through another door and shoots Dwight. Despite his wound, Dwight disarms William and tells him to leave with his car. As William leaves, Dwight tells the women that William is his half-brother. Hope attempts to attack Dwight as Kris reaches for a gun hidden under a recliner. Kris mortally wounds Dwight and accidentally kills Hope, but is shot dead by Dwight. Dwight dies on the floor, mumbling that the keys are in the car.

Cast
 Macon Blair as Dwight Evans
 Amy Hargreaves as Sam Evans
 David W. Thompson as William
 Devin Ratray as Ben Gaffney
 Sandy Barnett as Wade Cleland Jr.
 Kevin Kolack as Teddy Cleland
 Brent Werzner as Carl Cleland
 Eve Plumb as Kris Cleland
 Stacy Rock as Hope Cleland
 Sidné Anderson as Officer Eddy
 Bonnie Johnson as Margaret Gaffney

Production

Blair and Saulnier had been making movies together growing up and hoped to make a living out of it; however, as they both became older with families, they realized that that might not happen. After the disappointing reception of their horror comedy Murder Party, the two wanted to make one last film together. Saulnier said, "We embraced the fact that we had to wrap up this childhood arc—this insane fantasy of wanting to be filmmakers—and just make a film that was right and true." The concept of a revenge story appealed to Saulnier, who said that it "was just about grounding the film in a very mundane scenario that needed so little exposition." The film's plot also serves as a critique for Saulnier of films that he enjoyed growing up. In particular, several violent crimes in the early years of the 2010s "made [him] miserable", and he said he "couldn't do a film that was akin to those awesome genre spectacles of my youth" in said climate.

The film was financed with help from a successful Kickstarter campaign in 2012 asking for $35,000 and money from Saulnier's own savings. Saulnier initially did not want to use the crowd funding platform, as he felt conflicted about asking for help, specifically that donors could not invest in the back end through the site. However, he eventually realized that the positive outweighed the negative. Saulnier said that when making the pitch video for the campaign "I faced my worst nightmare" as he was camera shy.

Reception

Box office
Blue Ruin opened in 7 theaters in North America and earned $32,608 in its opening weekend averaging $4,658 per theater and ranking #52 at the box office. The film ultimately earned $258,384 domestically and $719,241 internationally for a total of $977,625. The film then was given a VOD release on April 25, 2014, followed by a home video release on July 22, 2014.

Critical reception
Rotten Tomatoes, a review aggregator, reports that 96% of 142 surveyed critics gave the film a positive review; the average rating is 8.02 out of 10. The critical consensus states "Smart, stripped-down, and thrillingly grim, Blue Ruin proves that a well-told revenge story can still leave its audience on the edge of their seat." The film also has a score of 78 out of 100 on Metacritic based on 33 critics, indicating "generally favorable reviews".

Top ten lists
Blue Ruin was listed on many critics' top ten lists for 2014.
 1st – Chase Whale, Twitch Film
 1st – Josh Bell, Las Vegas Weekly
 2nd – William Goss, Austin Chronicle
 5th – Marc Doyle, Metacritic
 7th – James Rocchi, The Wrap
 8th – Russ Fischer, Slash Film
 8th – A.A. Dowd, The A.V. Club
 8th – Haleigh Foutch, Collider
 10th – Nathan Rabin, The Dissolve

References

External links
 
 
 

2013 films
2013 independent films
2013 crime thriller films
2013 crime drama films
2013 thriller drama films
American crime thriller films
American crime drama films
American thriller drama films
American films about revenge
American independent films
Films about dysfunctional families
Films about murderers
Films directed by Jeremy Saulnier
Films set in Virginia
Kickstarter-funded films
2010s English-language films
2010s American films